The 2017 Georgian local elections were held on 21 October 2017 to elect the bodies of local government of Georgia: 2,058 members of representative councils (sakrebulo) and 64 mayors of municipalities. The votes went into second-round runoffs in six municipalities on 12 November 2017. The ruling Georgian Dream party won in all constituencies under the proportional contest and secured 62 out of 64 mayoral positions.

Background 

There are two types of municipalities in Georgia: self-governing cities and self-governing communities. The representative councils (sakrebulo) and executive heads of municipalities – mayors are directly elected by the citizens of Georgia to a four-year term. The election date was appointed by the President of Georgia 60 days prior to the polls and countersigned by the Prime Minister.
 
The previous elections were held in two rounds in 2014. Most of the sakrebulo (council) and gamgebeli (mayoral) seats were won by the ruling Georgian Dream coalition.

Election campaign 
The local non-governmental organizations monitoring the elections—the International Society for Fair Elections and Democracy (ISFED), the Georgian Young Lawyers Association (GYLA) and the Transparency International Georgia—jointly assessed the pre-election environment as mostly peaceful and noted that, while political parties were noticeably active, "the ruling party's dominance was evident". The most serious incident in the pre-election campaign occurred in the village of Kizilajlo of Marneuli Municipality in which the Georgian Dream's candidate and other persons were assaulted with a firearm at the party office on October 19.

In the 2017 elections, the first ever openly-gay candidate ran for public office in Georgia. Republican Party candidate Nino Bolkvadze aimed to take her place in the city assembly of the capital of Georgia. "Bolkvadze, who is running for the Republican Party, a small opposition force, said she hoped her campaign would put the spotlight on gay rights and change outdated public perceptions of LGBT people."

2017 Tbilisi mayoral election

The 2017 Tbilisi mayoral election was held on 21 October to elect the Mayor of Tbilisi.
Tbilisi City Assembly elections were held simultaneously.

The main candidates of the mayoral election were Kakha Kaladze, former footballer and minister of energy from the ruling Georgian Dream coalition; journalist Zaal Udumashvili from the UNM; independent candidate Aleko Elisashvili, journalist and a member of the Tbilisi City Assembly; Elene Khoshtaria from European Georgia, journalist and a member of the parliament; Irma Inashvili, leader of the Alliance of Patriots of Georgia and a member of the parliament.

Opinion polls

Results

Results 

 denotes a self-governing city.

See also 
 Administrative divisions of Georgia (country)
 Local government in Georgia (country)
 Tbilisi City Assembly
 Kutaisi City Assembly
 Batumi City Assembly

References 

Georgia
Georgia
Local election
Local elections in Georgia (country)